Petra Banović (born November 10, 1979 in Zagreb) is a freestyle and medley swimmer from Croatia, who competed in two consecutive Summer Olympics for her native country, starting in Sydney 2000. She graduated from Arizona State University in 2004 as an honor student. Petra is married to Julio Santos, a three-time Olympian from Ecuador.

External links
 Short profile on Croatian Olympic Committee

1979 births
Living people
Croatian female swimmers
Croatian female medley swimmers
Croatian female freestyle swimmers
Olympic swimmers of Croatia
Swimmers at the 2000 Summer Olympics
Swimmers at the 2004 Summer Olympics
Swimmers from Zagreb
Arizona State University alumni
21st-century Croatian women